Give Me a Try may refer to:

"Give Me a Try" (song), by The Wombats, 2015
"Give Me a Try", a song by Higgs and Wilson
"Give Me a Try", a song by Ivo Grīsniņš Grīslis that competed to represent Latvia in the Eurovision Song Contest 2013
"Give Me a Try", a song by Michelle Gayle
"Give Me a Try", a song by Sizzla from Rise to the Occasion